Velipojë is a village and a former municipality in Shkodër County, northwestern Albania. At the 2015 local government reform it became a subdivision of the municipality Shkodër. The population at the 2011 census was 5,031.
 

Velipojë is situated on the estuary of the Buna river (the only navigable river of Albania), where it flows into the Adriatic Sea while constituting the natural border with Montenegro. The administrative unit of Velipojë has a population of around 10,000, spread over several small settlements, the largest of which is the town of Velipojë itself. Since 2005, Velipoje lies within the boundaries of Buna River-Velipoja Protected Landscape.

Its economy is based on agriculture (arable land and livestock, sheep and cattle), some fishing, and chiefly tourism. The scenery is largely unspoilt: a mixture of sea-coast, river estuary, heathland, thick pine woods, farmland, and high mountains. It has been remarked by visitors that the heath-land to the north of Velipoja is very reminiscent of Scottish scenery. The area is a prime site for birdwatching, game shooting and fishing. A long, sandy curative beach with a seaside promenade is a popular attraction in the summer.

In recent years, several projects have been instituted with the aim of conserving the environment (including the marine life of the Buna) and the encouragement of ecological tourism. There have also been recent efforts to develop fish farming. The area has many small hotels and guest houses. There is a market, where local farmers sell their produce. In the commune, there is a church-sponsored kindergarten, several primary schools, two secondary schools, and one gymnasium. There is also a small theatre and a thriving local football team, KS Ada Velipojë and ground.

The construction of the highway that started in 2021 linking Shëngjin with Velipojë will further develop tourism and the local economy. Velipoja hosts the Land and Sand Art Festival consisting of carving sand sculptures along the beach.

See also
Buna River-Velipoja Protected Landscape
Shengjin
Albanian Adriatic Sea Coast
Albanian Riviera
Tourism in Albania

References

External links
InVelipoja.com Tourist Guide

Former municipalities in Shkodër County
Seaside resorts in Albania
Administrative units of Shkodër
Villages in Shkodër County